The PEGAZ 011 is a medium-range tactical UAV for day and night attack (armed variant), reconnaissance and surveillance missions, target acquisition and designation developed by Military Technical Institute in Serbia and produced by Utva Aviation Industry, subsidiary of Yugoimport SDPR. Its flight autonomy is over 12 hours, and it sends data from the height of 6,000 m. Powered by a two-cylinder boxer type of engine with 32 kW (43 HP), it reaches the maximum flight speed of 200 km/h. The PEGAZ has a maximum weight of 240 kg, including about 50 kg of reconnaissance/surveillance equipment. It is 5.4 m long with a wingspan of 6.34 m. It takes off automatically from improvised runways and performs tasks along pre-programmed flight (optional: catapult). There are two hardpoints for optional air-to-surface missiles for attack variant.

Specifications

  Armament:
 2x FT-8D laser guided rocket.

Operators 

  – 353rd Reconnaissance Squadron of the Serbian Air Force and Air Defence

See also

References

External links

 Military Technical Institute Pegaz page
 Serbian National TV raport on Pegaz maiden flight

Military Technical Institute Belgrade
Unmanned military aircraft of Serbia